× Laeliocatarthron, abbreviated Lcr. in the horticultural trade, is the nothogenus containing intergeneric hybrids with at least one ancestor in each of the natural genera Cattleya, Caularthron, and Laelia, and with no ancestors in any other natural genera.

Origin 
A × Laeliocatarthron can be produced by hybrids of the following nothogenera and/or natural genera:
 Cattleya × [[× Caulaelia|Caulaelia]] Caularthron  × Laeliocattleya Caulaelia × Laeliocattleya Caulaelia × Caulocattleya Caulocattleya × Laeliocattleya Caulocattleya × Laelia Laeliocatarthron × Cattleya Laeliocatarthron × Caulaelia Laeliocatarthron × Caularthron Laeliocatarthron × Caulocattleya Laeliocatarthron × Laelia Laeliocatarthron × Laeliocatarthron Laeliocatarthron × Laeliocattleya''

References 

Laeliinae
Orchid nothogenera